The following is a list of post-classical physicians who were known to have practised, contributed, or theorised about medicine in some form between the 5th and 15th century CE.

Notes
1.Assumed gender.

References 

Medieval physicians
Lists of physicians